The FIVB Men's Volleyball World Olympic Qualification Tournament was a volleyball qualification tournament for the Olympic Games. contested by the senior men's national teams of the members of the  (FIVB), the sport's global governing body.

A corresponding tournament for women's national teams is the FIVB Women's Volleyball World Olympic Qualification Tournament.

Qualification

First tournament (2016)

Second tournament (2016)

Results summary

First format (1972–1984)

Second format (1988–2012)

Third format (2016)

Appearance

See also
FIVB Women's Volleyball World Olympic Qualification Tournament
FIVB Men's Volleyball Intercontinental Olympic Qualification Tournament

References

Volleyball qualification for the Summer Olympics
Recurring sporting events established in 1996
Recurring sporting events disestablished in 2016
International men's volleyball competitions
Quadrennial sporting events